Manuel Giuseppe Pisano (born 5 April 2006) is an Italian footballer who plays as a forward for German club Bayern Munich U17.

Career 
Pisano was born in Turin, Italy. He started his career at Barracuda (under-11) and then at Pozzomaina (under-12). Pisano had a trial at AC Milan, with whom he impressed during a tournament in Palermo, before Juventus signed him in 2019, aged 13. During the 2021–22 season he wore the Juventus U16 shirt, scoring six goals. In May 2022, he moved to Germany and joined Bayern Munich's under-17 team.

Style of play 
Holger Seitz was impressed by Pisano's physicality and coldness in goal, as he is already 1.87 m (6 ft 2 in) tall at age 16.

Career statistics

International

References 

Living people
2006 births
Juventus F.C. players
FC Bayern Munich footballers
Italian footballers
Association football forwards
Italy youth international footballers
21st-century Italian people